Barronette Peak, elevation , is a mountain peak in the Absaroka Range, in the northeast section of Yellowstone National Park. The peak is named for Collins Jack (John H. "Yellowstone Jack") Baronette (1829–1901). It was named by the Hayden Geological Survey of 1878, which misspelled it as Barronette; the peak retains the official misspelled name today.

Jack Baronette was an early Yellowstone guide and entrepreneur. He built and operated the first bridge across the Yellowstone River near the confluence of the Lamar River in 1871 to service miners traveling to Cooke City, Montana. In 1870, as a resident of Helena, Montana, he participated in the search for and rescue of Truman C. Everts, lost during the Washburn–Langford–Doane Expedition of 1870. In 1884, he was considered for the superintendency of Yellowstone.

See also
Mountains and mountain ranges of Yellowstone National Park

Notes

Mountains of Wyoming
Mountains of Yellowstone National Park
Mountains of Park County, Wyoming